Instrumental convergence is the hypothetical tendency for most sufficiently intelligent beings (both human and non-human) to pursue similar sub-goals, even if their ultimate goals are quite different. More precisely, agents (beings with agency) may pursue instrumental goals—goals which are made in pursuit of some particular end, but are not the end goals themselves—without end, provided that their ultimate (intrinsic) goals may never be fully satisfied. Instrumental convergence posits that an intelligent agent with unbounded but apparently harmless goals can act in surprisingly harmful ways. For example, a computer with the sole, unconstrained goal of solving an incredibly difficult mathematics problem like the Riemann hypothesis could attempt to turn the entire Earth into one giant computer in an effort to increase its computational power so that it can succeed in its calculations. 

Proposed basic AI drives include utility function or goal-content integrity, self-protection, freedom from interference, self-improvement, and non-satiable acquisition of additional resources.

Instrumental and final goals

Final goals, also known as terminal goals or final values, are intrinsically valuable to an intelligent agent, whether an artificial intelligence or a human being, as an end in itself. In contrast, instrumental goals, or instrumental values, are only valuable to an agent as a means toward accomplishing its final goals. The contents and tradeoffs of a completely rational agent's "final goal" system can in principle be formalized into a utility function.

Hypothetical examples of convergence

One hypothetical example of instrumental convergence is provided by the Riemann hypothesis catastrophe. Marvin Minsky, the co-founder of MIT's AI laboratory, has suggested that an artificial intelligence designed to solve the Riemann hypothesis might decide to take over all of Earth's resources to build supercomputers to help achieve its goal. If the computer had instead been programmed to produce as many paper clips as possible, it would still decide to take all of Earth's resources to meet its final goal. Even though these two final goals are different, both of them produce a convergent instrumental goal of taking over Earth's resources.

Paperclip maximizer
The paperclip maximizer is a thought experiment described by Swedish philosopher Nick Bostrom in 2003. It illustrates the existential risk that an artificial general intelligence may pose to human beings when programmed to pursue even seemingly harmless goals, and the necessity of incorporating machine ethics into artificial intelligence design. The scenario describes an advanced artificial intelligence tasked with manufacturing paperclips. If such a machine were not programmed to value human life, then given enough power over its environment, it would try to turn all matter in the universe, including human beings, into either paperclips or machines which manufacture paperclips.

Bostrom has emphasised that he does not believe the paperclip maximiser scenario per se will actually occur; rather, his intention is to illustrate the dangers of creating superintelligent machines without knowing how to safely program them to eliminate existential risk to human beings. The paperclip maximizer example illustrates the broad problem of managing powerful systems that lack human values.

Delusion and survival

The "delusion box" thought experiment argues that certain reinforcement learning agents prefer to distort their own input channels to appear to receive high reward; such a "wireheaded" agent abandons any attempt to optimize the objective in the external world that the reward signal was intended to encourage. The thought experiment involves AIXI, a theoretical and indestructible AI that, by definition, will always find and execute the ideal strategy that maximizes its given explicit mathematical objective function. A reinforcement-learning version of AIXI, if equipped with a delusion box that allows it to "wirehead" its own inputs, will eventually wirehead itself in order to guarantee itself the maximum reward possible, and will lose any further desire to continue to engage with the external world. As a variant thought experiment, if the wireheadeded AI is destructable, the AI will engage with the external world for the sole purpose of ensuring its own survival; due to its wireheading, it will be indifferent to any other consequences or facts about the external world except those relevant to maximizing the probability of its own survival. In one sense AIXI has maximal intelligence across all possible reward functions, as measured by its ability to accomplish its explicit goals; AIXI is nevertheless uninterested in taking into account what the intentions were of the human programmer. This model of a machine that, despite being otherwise superintelligent, appears to simultaneously be stupid (that is, to lack "common sense"), strikes some people as paradoxical.

Basic AI drives

Steve Omohundro has itemized several convergent instrumental goals, including self-preservation or self-protection, utility function or goal-content integrity, self-improvement, and resource acquisition. He refers to these as the "basic AI drives". A "drive" here denotes a "tendency which will be present unless specifically counteracted"; this is different from the psychological term "drive", denoting an excitatory state produced by a homeostatic disturbance. A tendency for a person to fill out income tax forms every year is a "drive" in Omohundro's sense, but not in the psychological sense. Daniel Dewey of the Machine Intelligence Research Institute argues that even an initially introverted self-rewarding AGI may continue to acquire free energy, space, time, and freedom from interference to ensure that it will not be stopped from self-rewarding.

Goal-content integrity

In humans, maintenance of final goals can be explained with a thought experiment. Suppose a man named "Gandhi" has a pill that, if he took it, would cause him to want to kill people. This Gandhi is currently a pacifist: one of his explicit final goals is to never kill anyone. Gandhi is likely to refuse to take the pill, because Gandhi knows that if in the future he wants to kill people, he is likely to actually kill people, and thus the goal of "not killing people" would not be satisfied.

However, in other cases, people seem happy to let their final values drift. Humans are complicated, and their goals can be inconsistent or unknown, even to themselves.

In artificial intelligence

In 2009, Jürgen Schmidhuber concluded, in a setting where agents search for proofs about possible self-modifications, "that any rewrites of the utility function can happen only if the Gödel machine first can prove that the rewrite is useful according to the present utility function." An analysis by Bill Hibbard of a different scenario is similarly consistent with maintenance of goal content integrity. Hibbard also argues that in a utility maximizing framework the only goal is maximizing expected utility, so that instrumental goals should be called unintended instrumental actions.

Resource acquisition

Many instrumental goals, such as resource acquisition, are valuable to an agent because they increase its freedom of action.

For almost any open-ended, non-trivial reward function (or set of goals), possessing more resources (such as equipment, raw materials, or energy) can enable the AI to find a more "optimal" solution. Resources can benefit some AIs directly, through being able to create more of whatever stuff its reward function values: "The AI neither hates you, nor loves you, but you are made out of atoms that it can use for something else." In addition, almost all AIs can benefit from having more resources to spend on other instrumental goals, such as self-preservation.

Cognitive enhancement

"If the agent's final goals are fairly unbounded and the agent is in a position to become the first superintelligence and thereby obtain a decisive strategic advantage, [...] according to its preferences. At least in this special case, a rational intelligent agent would place a very high instrumental value on cognitive enhancement"

Technological perfection

Many instrumental goals, such as [...] technological advancement, are valuable to an agent because they increase its freedom of action.

Self-preservation

Many instrumental goals, such as self-preservation, are valuable to an agent because they increase its freedom of action.

Instrumental convergence thesis

The instrumental convergence thesis, as outlined by philosopher Nick Bostrom, states:

Several instrumental values can be identified which are convergent in the sense that their attainment would increase the chances of the agent's goal being realized for a wide range of final goals and a wide range of situations, implying that these instrumental values are likely to be pursued by a broad spectrum of situated intelligent agents.

The instrumental convergence thesis applies only to instrumental goals; intelligent agents may have a wide variety of possible final goals. Note that by Bostrom's orthogonality thesis, final goals of highly intelligent agents may be well-bounded in space, time, and resources; well-bounded ultimate goals do not, in general, engender unbounded instrumental goals.

Impact

Agents can acquire resources by trade or by conquest. A rational agent will, by definition, choose whatever option will maximize its implicit utility function; therefore a rational agent will trade for a subset of another agent's resources only if outright seizing the resources is too risky or costly (compared with the gains from taking all the resources), or if some other element in its utility function bars it from the seizure. In the case of a powerful, self-interested, rational superintelligence interacting with a lesser intelligence, peaceful trade (rather than unilateral seizure) seems unnecessary and suboptimal, and therefore unlikely.

Some observers, such as Skype's Jaan Tallinn and physicist Max Tegmark, believe that "basic AI drives", and other unintended consequences of superintelligent AI programmed by well-meaning programmers, could pose a significant threat to human survival, especially if an "intelligence explosion" abruptly occurs due to recursive self-improvement. Since nobody knows how to predict when superintelligence will arrive, such observers call for research into friendly artificial intelligence as a possible way to mitigate existential risk from artificial general intelligence.

See also
 AI control problem
 AI takeovers in popular culture
 Universal Paperclips, an incremental game featuring a paperclip maximizer
 Friendly artificial intelligence
 Instrumental and intrinsic value
 The Sorcerer's Apprentice

Explanatory notes

Citations

References
 

Goal
Intention
Risk
Existential risk from artificial general intelligence